Xiomara is a feminine Spanish given name, which is probably of Guanche ancestry that can be compared with Guacimara or , which share the same suffixes.

It is also less likely a variant of Guiomar and derived from the German name Wigmar, which means "battle ready" or "battle famous" (also a homophone of the Guanche toponym Güímar)  or derived from uuiu (cf. gwiw) which means worthy in Old Breton and marc'h (cf. marc'h) which means horse in Breton. In the United States it ranked 986th place in names for female newborns in 2010.

Notable people with the name include:

 Xiomara Alfaro (1930–2018), Cuban singer
 Xiomara Blandino (born 1984), Nicaraguan model
 Xiomara Castro (born 1959), Honduran president
 Xiomara De Oliver (born 1967), Canadian-born artist
 Xiomara Fortuna (born 1959), Dominican singer
 Xiomara Getrouw (born 1994), Surinamese swimmer
 Xiomara Griffith (born 1969), Venezuelan judoka
 Xiomara Larios (born 1958), Nicaraguan sprinter
 Xiomara Laugart (born 1960), Cuban singer
 Xiomara Molero (born 1971), Puerto Rican volleyball player and coach
 Xiomara Reyes (born 1983), Cuban ballet dancer
 Xiomara Rivero (born 1968), Cuban athlete
 Xiomara Scott, Venezuelan nurse killed during the 2017 protests in Venezuela
 Xiomara Vidal (born 1955), Cuban trovadora

References

Spanish feminine given names